The 1895 VMI Keydets football team represented the Virginia Military Institute (VMI) in their fifth season of organized football. The Keydets went 5–1, which was the program's fifth winning season in five years.

Schedule

References

VMI
VMI Keydets football seasons
VMI Keydets football